The Bearreraig Sandstone Formation is a geological formation in Scotland. It preserves fossils dating back to the lower to middle parts of the Jurassic period (Toarcian–Bajocian). The remains of the proximal portion of a right ulna and radius of an indeterminate thyreophoran dinosaur are known from the formation. The ichthyosaur Dearcmhara is also known from the formation.

See also 
 List of fossiliferous stratigraphic units in Scotland

References

Further reading 
 R. M. Bateman, N. Morton, and B.L. Dower. 2000. Early Middle Jurassic plant communities in Northwest Scotland: Paleoecological and paleoclimatic significance. GeoResearch Forum 6:501-512

Geologic formations of Scotland
Jurassic System of Europe
Jurassic Scotland
Aalenian Stage
Bajocian Stage
Toarcian Stage
Sandstone formations
Shallow marine deposits
Paleontology in Scotland